Thomas of Hales, also known as Thomas de Hales, was a thirteenth-century English Franciscan friar and ecclesiastical writer of intellectually progressive prose and poetry in three languages: Latin, French, and English. Thomas of Hales was one of very few Franciscan lyricists of the mid to late thirteenth century. His "career is an importantly the day witness of the literary culture of ... mid-thirteenth-century England. Few other writers show hiEngland, and his works put him at the forefront of the movement towards affective piety, vernacular literacy, and textual scholarship based on university methods. His English poem Love Rune is frequently anthologized. He is believed to come from Hales, Gloucestershire. A few works of his survive. One, in Latin, is a life of the Virgin Mary called De vita seu genealogia Beatae Virginis Mariae, which survives in a thirteenth-century copy once in the library of the abbey of St Victor (now University of Basel Library, MS B.VIII. 1., fols. 47vb–57vb). It draws from the Gospels, Apocrypha, patristic texts, and the visions of Elizabeth of Schönau. This was his most popular work, and while it is not theologically adventurous its spirit and organization reflect ideas and methods then popular in university settings. Its approach to Mary's life falls in line with trends in affective piety.

A second work is a sermon written in French with short prayers written in Latin called the Anglo-Norman Sermon, which can be found in Oxford, St John's College, MS 190. The Sermon is a meditation on the Life of Christ organized according to the Parable of the Talents, where each talent that the sinner renders to Christ at the Last Judgment is a particular event in Christ's own life like the Incarnation or the Ascension. Like the De Vita...Beatae Virginis Mariae, the Sermon encourages an affective response to the life and suffering of its subject.

The third work, the Love Rune or A Luve Ron—or love song, is written in English and was composed between 1234 and 1272.  "The jewel-like lyric presented here is to be read in the spirit of a riddle or conundrum, one that imparts a mysterious, holy wisdom to be lived and learned by heart."

Recent evidence has shown that he intervened with Queen Eleanor of Provence, wife of Henry III, on behalf of converts and the religious.

References

Editions
 Susanne Greer Fein (ed.), Moral Love Songs and Lament, (Kalamazoo, MI: Medieval Institute Publications, 1998). Contains an edition of the Love Rune; there is also an online version at Thomas of Hales, Love Rune | Robbins Library Digital Projects). Thomas of Hales, Love Rune: Introduction | Robbins Library Digital Projects
 Raphael Holinshed, John Hooker, Francis Thynne, Abraham Fleming, John Stow, Sir Henry Ellis '1807' "Holinshed's Chronicles of England, Scotland, and Ireland ...: England"
 Sarah M. Horrall (ed.), The Lyf of Oure Lady: The ME Translation of Thomas de Hales' Vita Sancte Marie. Heidelberg: Carl Winter, 1985.
 M. Dominica Legge, "The Anglo-Norman Sermon of Thomas of Hales," Modern Language Review 30 (1935), 212-218.
 Denis Renevey, '1215–1349: texts', in Samuel Fanous and Vincent Gillespie, eds, The Cambridge Companion to Medieval English Mysticism, (Cambridge, 2011), pp99–103.

Further reading
 Betty Hill, ‘The Luve Ron and Thomas de Hales’, Modern Language Review 59 (1964), 321-330.
 Sarah M. Horrall, "Thomas of Hales, O.F.M.: His Life and Works," Traditio 42 (1986), 287-298.
 Thomas J. O'Donnell, "Thomas of Hales, English Franciscan, poet, and scholar, fl. 1250s," International Encyclopaedia for the Middle Ages-Online. A Supplement to LexMA-Online. Turnhout: Brepols Publishers, 2006, in Brepolis Medieval Encyclopaedias <BREPOLiS>

13th-century English poets
British writers in French
Christian hagiographers
English sermon writers
Franciscan scholars
Medieval Latin poets
Middle English poets
People from Gloucestershire
13th-century Latin writers